Vřesina is a municipality and village in Ostrava-City District in the Moravian-Silesian Region of the Czech Republic. It has about 2,900 inhabitants.

History
The first written mention of Vřesina is from 1377.

Twin towns – sister cities

Klimkovice is twinned with:
 Kornowac, Poland

References

External links

Villages in Ostrava-City District